The Greek frigate Psara (F-454) is the third ship of the Greek s. It is based on the Blohm + Voss MEKO 200 frigate class and was built by Hellenic Shipyards Co. at Skaramangas as part of the programme.
She has participated in various NATO and international operations such as Sharp Guard, Decisive Enhancement, Operation Enduring Freedom, EU Operation Atalanta.

References

External links
Official Hellenic Navy page for Hydra Class Frigates (English)
SNMG-1 Press release on Spessart incident 
Video of capture, by the Hellenic Navy

1994 ships
Ships built in Greece
Hydra-class frigates
Frigates of Greece